Sayaq is a town in Karaganda Region in eastern Kazakhstan.

Transport 

It is the terminus of a branch of the national railway system.

See also 

 Railway stations in Kazakhstan

References 

Populated places in Karaganda Region